The 2010 National Football League known for sponsorship reasons as the Allianz National Football League was the 79th staging of the National Football League (NFL), an annual Gaelic football tournament for the Gaelic Athletic Association county teams of Ireland. The League began on Saturday 6 February 2010. Thirty-two Gaelic football county teams from Ireland, plus London, participated.
On 25 April, Cork defeated Mayo by 1–17 to 0–12 to win their sixth league title and their third in a row.

Format

League structure
The 2010 format of the National Football League was a system of four divisions. The top three divisions consisted of 8 teams, and Division 4 contained nine teams. Each team played every other team in its division once, either home or away. 2 points were awarded for a win and 1 for a draw.

Tie-breaker
If only two teams were level on points:
 The team that won the head-to-head match was ranked first
 If this game was a draw, points difference (total scored minus total conceded in all games) was used to rank the teams
 If points difference was identical, total scored was used to rank the teams
 If still identical, a play-off was required
If three or more teams were level on points, points difference was used to rank the teams.

Finals, promotions and relegations
The top two teams in Division 1 contested the 2010 NFL final. The top two teams in divisions 2, 3 and 4 were promoted, and contested the finals of their respective divisions. The bottom two teams in divisions 1, 2 and 3 were relegated.

Division 1

Division 1

NFL Final 2010

Division 2

Final

Division 3

Final

Division 4

Final

Statistics
All scores correct as of 29 March 2016

Scoring
Widest winning margin: 29
Limerick 8–13 – 2–2 Kilkenny (Division 4)
Most goals in a match: 10
Limerick 8–13 – 2–2 Kilkenny (Division 4)
Most points in a match: 36
Cork 1–19 – 1–17 Galway (Division 1)
Most goals by one team in a match: 8
Limerick 8–13 – 2–2 Kilkenny (Division 4)
 Highest aggregate score: 45 points
Limerick 8–13 – 2–2 Kilkenny (Division 4)
Lowest aggregate score: 17 points
Armagh 0–12 – 0–5 Kildare (Division 2)

Top scorers
Overall

Single game

References

 
National Football League
National Football League (Ireland) seasons